Silver Falls, is a waterfall in the Mount Rainier National Park in the U.S. state of Washington. The falls were formed as the Ohanapecosh River drops 95 feet into a narrow canyon, the largest of which plunges 40 feet. The Silver Falls loop track has an elevation gain of 350m.

References

Mount Rainier National Park
Waterfalls of Lewis County, Washington
Waterfalls of Washington (state)